Ryoo Seung-bum (born August 9, 1980) is a South Korean actor. He made a name for himself in his older brother director Ryoo Seung-wan's eclectic films, notably Die Bad (his acting debut in 2000), Arahan (2004), Crying Fist (2005), The Unjust (2010), and The Berlin File (2013). Known for his manic energy, casual demeanor and subtle ability to command a scene, over the years Ryoo Seung-bum has cemented his status as one of Korea's top actors.

Early life
Ryoo Seung-bum was born in Asan, South Chungcheong Province. His family moved to Seoul, where he first studied at Jamjeon Elementary School, before moving back to a small town in South Chungcheong Province called Onyang, where he spent his middle school years. He returned to Seoul to study at Daedong Technical High School, but dropped out before graduating. Ryoo later said he had a hard time finding the motivation to study, but acting would bring about an important change in his life, giving him something he could immerse himself into.

Career

Early work
His older brother Ryoo Seung-wan was an aspiring filmmaker, and from 1996 to 1999, the elder Ryoo shot four low-budget short films starring himself, his younger brother Seung-bum, and several friends. In strikingly diverse styles but with a common narrative, these shorts were re-edited, combined and released in 2000 as Ryoo Seung-wan's feature directorial debut Die Bad. Critically acclaimed as powerfully visceral, gut-wrenching, and searingly angry, the film became an instant cult hit, earning attention for the Ryoo brothers. One review described Ryoo Seung-bum's acting debut as "a startling, naturalistic turn," and he won Best New Actor at the Grand Bell Awards.

Their success continued with Ryoo Seung-wan's follow-up Dachimawa Lee, a 35-minute short film parodying Korean action films of the 60s and 70s, Bruce Lee, Shaw Brothers and Jackie Chan flicks, and the machismo kitsch of old Korean melodramas, coupled with over-the-top voice dubbing and deliberately mistimed action. Ryoo played Washington, a young thug with a heart of gold and a huge afro. The short, streamed on the now-defunct Cine4M website, was enormously popular online.

Ryoo next starred in Yim Soon-rye's Waikiki Brothers, a 2001 film chronicling the fate of a shoddy nightclub band, with its bittersweet mixture of boyhood aspirations and the love of music, and the despair and reality of adulthood. Ryoo had a supporting role as a young waiter eager to learn how to play the drums and perform onstage.

Later that year, he ventured into television, as part of the main cast of 50-episode family drama Wonderful Days, along with Ji Sung, Park Sun-young, and Gong Hyo-jin. Ryoo received Best New Actor for TV from the Baeksang Arts Awards.

In 2002, he appeared in Ryoo Seung-wan's sophomore effort, the gangster/heist film No Blood No Tears starring Jeon Do-yeon and Jung Jae-young. The film was a critical and box office disappointment. But he was starting to make a name for himself in the industry independent of his older brother. Ryoo joined Jung, Shin Ha-kyun and an ensemble cast of Jang Jin regulars in No Comment (also known as Mudjima Family), an omnibus made of three short films. His performance as a harassed concierge was one of the highlights of the first short Enemies in Four Directions. He also had a small role in Park Chan-wook's Sympathy for Mr. Vengeance.

He then reunited with Noh Hee-kyung, the writer of Wonderful Days, in the TV drama Solitude, a May–December romance between a man in his early twenties and a much older single mother who is also terminally ill (played by Lee Mi-sook).

Conduct Zero capped Ryoo's year, in his first big screen leading role as the tough, fists-over-brains "king" of his high school who unexpectedly and awkwardly falls for a nerdy girl (played by Lim Eun-kyung). The 1980s-set comedy was a minor hit, selling nearly 1.7 million tickets and solidifying Ryoo's star status.

Ryoo made his theater debut in Lee Sang-woo's stage play Bieonso ("Toilet"). Directed by stage/TV actor Park Kwang-jung, Bieonso ran at the Dongsoong Art Center from November 4 to December 28, 2003.

For the TV program Nursery Story, Ryoo and Yoon Jin-seo appeared in Christmas Lovers, which aired in four five-minute daily installments on MBC in December 22 to December 25, 2003. In Min Kyu-dong's short Secrets and Lies (released by the Korean Academy of Film Arts in the 2003 omnibus Twentidentity), Ryoo's character finds himself in a dilemma when his fiancee's mother hits on him.

Ryoo began 2004 in the TV series Sunlight Pours Down co-starring Song Hye-kyo and Jo Hyun-jae, but it proved unmemorable to audiences. Thereafter Ryoo would concentrate solely on film.

In Ryoo Seung-wan's Arahan, he played a hapless traffic policeman who discovers he has untapped martial arts potential, as he's trained by masters played by Ahn Sung-ki and Yoon So-yi. Part modern-day wuxia, part superhero film and part local comedy, it was Ryoo Seung-wan's first foray into commercial cinema, and the film was a relative box office success at around 2 million tickets sold. It also established Ryoo's star charisma and his natural affinity for comedy.

Ryoo then starred in Kim Sung-su's online short Back (streamed on Daum in October 2004). Set in a dystopia where everyone literally moves backward, his character sparks a revolution and becomes hunted by the authorities by daring to move forward.

Critical success
Though Ryoo had been steadily impressing critics and audiences since his debut, it was Crying Fist in 2005 that would change his career. Considered a showcase for the talents of the Ryoo brothers, the movie is a real-life-inspired story of two boxers, showing their journeys in a parallel narrative structure: one is a hardened teenage criminal who takes up boxing in reform school, the other a retired boxer in his forties earning his keep as a "human punching bag" who returns to the ring partly to redeem himself in the eyes of his son and wife. Only at the climax would the two protagonists meet as opponents in the final match, two men from different backgrounds and social positions, but united in their status as total losers, struggling to regain self-respect and purpose in their lives. Ryoo and co-star Choi Min-sik underwent boxing training like they were preparing for a real match; they didn't use body doubles in the scene and exchanged real blows. Director Ryoo Seung-wan discussed on the film's DVD how his brother had to access his real personality and real-life memories for his onscreen breakdown, and critics praised Ryoo's range, caged fury and passion in the role, calling the performance amazing and mesmerizing, such that he overshadowed his older, more prestigious colleague Choi. Crying Fist opened against A Bittersweet Life, and despite excellent reviews for both films, they ended up canceling each other out at the box office, selling a little over a million tickets each. This performance cemented Ryoo's reputation as one of the top actors of his generation, and one of the country's leading acting figures.

For a change of pace, Ryoo next starred in the romantic comedy The Beast and the Beauty, playing a voice actor who lies about his looks to his blind pianist girlfriend (played by Shin Min-ah).

In 2006, his real-life ex-girlfriend Gong Hyo-jin asked him to make a cameo appearance in Kim Tae-yong's critically acclaimed drama Family Ties. He played her character's ex-boyfriend, lending a meta aspect and irony to their few scenes together.

He then returned to film noir with Bloody Tie opposite Hwang Jung-min (they had previously worked together in Waikiki Brothers). Set amidst the meth drug trade in Busan after the IMF crisis, the film drew unanimously positive reviews. Critics praised Ryoo's portrayal of a small-time drug dealer, and he won Best Actor at the Golden Cinematography Awards and the Baeksang Arts Awards.

Ryoo and Im Chang-jung lent their voices to the adult animated comedy Aachi & Ssipak, set in a futuristic world fueled by human feces where the government implants a microchip into each of its citizens' anuses to check their bowel movements for stable energy supply, rewarding good performance with addictive popsicles. As the title characters, Ryoo and Im play street gangsters who steal popsicles and sell them in the black market. Ryoo reprised his role as Aachi; he had previously voiced the character in a Flash animated demo clip introduced as an internet sneak preview in 2001 (Ssipak was originally voiced by Im Won-hee), However, due to investor problems, it would take a total of eight years for the feature-length film to be finished. Like its predecessors in homegrown animation My Beautiful Girl, Mari and Wonderful Days, Aachi & Ssipak was well-reviewed, but a box office flop.

In 2007, Ryoo had a small role in Im Chang-jung's comedy Underground Rendezvous. He played a teacher assigned to a mountainous village, but who gets trapped in the middle of nowhere for three months, unable to move his right foot after stepping on a land mine; reviews called his cameo appearance "hilarious."

2008 to 2010
Radio Dayz marked Ryoo's next leading role in 2008. He played Lloyd, a fast-thinking producer of an underfunded and understaffed radio program during Japanese colonial rule in 1930. To gain listeners, he creates a radio drama, the first of its kind in Korea, using formulaic tropes such as love triangles, amnesia, long-lost siblings, etc. The show's success also attracts the attention of the Japanese colonial government, and one of his voice actors is secretly working for the Korean Independence Army. Ryoo was praised for his versatility and nuanced take on the role, but the film did not do well at the box office.

Ryoo Seung-wan's next film Dachimawa Lee returned to the beloved character from his 2000 short (played by Im Won-hee). The spy action film/parody is set during the 1940s in the last years of Japanese colonial rule, as Dachimawa Lee, his allies and enemies search for the whereabouts of a stolen national treasure, a golden Buddha statue that also contains a list of Korean freedom fighters wanted by imperial authorities. Ryoo played one of the minor villains, making quirky vagabond Border Lynx into a likeable rogue.

In 2009, Ryoo, Park Hae-il, Moon So-ri, and Uhm Ji-won starred in Baik Hyun-jhin's 33-minute short film The End, in which four episodes with different stories all end with the close-up shot of the actor's facial expressions for more than 1 minute, then superimposed is the text, "The End."

Ryoo said he chose his next film, No Mercy, simply because he wanted to work with actor Sol Kyung-gu. Ryoo played an environmental activist who confesses to a series of murders, then forces a renowned autopsy specialist (played by Sol) to compromise all his professional ethics by tampering with autopsy results in order to save his kidnapped daughter from being killed. The film was criticized for its lack of visual style and convoluted plot, but reviews said the film's highlight was the dramatic intensity between the two lead actors in their confrontation scenes in the police interrogation room, with Ryoo playing his role with a subtle eeriness.

Kim Dae-woo's The Servant subverted the classic folktale Chunhyangjeon with the premise that the heroine Chunhyang is ambitious instead of virtuous, and that she falls in love with Bang-ja, the servant of Lee Mong-ryong (while Lee, played by Ryoo, is far from heroic). Co-starring Kim Joo-hyuk and Jo Yeo-jeong, the costume drama depicted the Joseon era's sexual mores and class system with sly humor and cynicism.

Ensemble comedy Foxy Festival explored unconventional sexual preferences in a light-hearted and non-judgmental manner, and in it Ryoo played a fish sausage ("odeng") hawker with a RealDoll fetish.

His most significant film in 2010 was The Unjust. When a fall guy is chosen for a highly publicized serial killer case, a homicide detective (played by Hwang Jung-min), a prosecutor (played by Ryoo), and a shady real-estate tycoon (played by Yoo Hae-jin) all become involved in a complex web of power struggle. The crime thriller was a hard-hitting indictment of corruption at every level of Korea's justice infrastructure. This was his fifth collaboration with Ryoo Seung-wan, who said, "My decision to cast him isn't just because he's my younger brother. It has mostly to do with the fact he’s a great actor and it's comfortable for me to work with him." For Ryoo's stunningly accurate portrayal of the arrogance, rudeness and weariness of stereotypical Korean middle-aged men in positions of power, he won Best Actor at the Buil Film Awards and the Fantasia Festival in Canada.

2011 to 2013
In the 2011 comedy The Suicide Forecast, Ryoo played a baseball player-turned-top insurance salesman whose promotion is jeopardized when the police suspect him of aiding and abetting a client's suicide, so he goes on a quest to get in touch with his "suspicious" life insurance clients and turn their lives around for the better. Ryoo was criticized for giving curt answers to the press at the movie premiere; his agency apologized on his behalf, saying it was his first time to see the film in its entirety so he needed time to organize his thoughts. Ryoo later called human comedy "an extremely cruel genre" to "people who are actually living that reality by making people laugh and cry over someone's pain." But he said he liked the film for trying "to draw a hopeful message from out of it and offer cheerful consolation rather than handle it in a depressing way." 
 
Ryoo played a zombie in Yim Pil-sung's short film A Brave New World, part of the science fiction omnibus Doomsday Book. His zombie make-up took six hours daily to put on. Ryoo shot the film in 2006, but because of financing problems, it was only released in 2012.

In 2012, he joined the cast of black comedy Over My Dead Body, along with Lee Beom-soo and Kim Ok-bin. Ryoo was a scene stealer in the role of a daft character who fakes his own death in order to hide from loan sharks and collect his insurance money, but stumbles into two researchers attempting to steal a corpse with an embedded computer chip containing stolen technology.

Later that year, he starred in Perfect Number, a film adaptation of popular Japanese mystery novel The Devotion of Suspect X by Keigo Higashino. Ryoo played a genius mathematics professor who plans the perfect alibi for the woman he secretly loves (played by Lee Yo-won) when she unexpectedly murders her abusive ex-husband. He said it was his first time to portray self-sacrificing love, and director Bang Eun-jin commended the maturity in his acting when she instructed him "to cry with your heart, not with the face."

He was cast in a supporting role in The Berlin File, Ryoo Seung-wan's 2013 spy thriller also starring Ha Jung-woo, Han Suk-kyu, and Jun Ji-hyun. Playing a ruthless assassin and the son of a high ranking North Korean official, Ryoo spoke German, English, and North Korean dialect in the film. The New York Times praised his portrayal for its "electrifying viciousness," and The Korea Times called him "brilliant." The Berlin File sold more than 7 million tickets, making it Korea's top all-time action movie. It is also the biggest hit of Ryoo's career thus far.

2015 to present
Following The Berlin File, Ryoo went on a hiatus from show business because he said he no longer wanted to be an "overly commercialized product." He traveled all over Europe, then lived in Paris for three years where he worked as a model. Ryoo returned to acting in 2015 with a leading role in Im Sang-soo's Intimate Enemies, a thriller about four people who find bags of money at a car crash site and decide to use it to mete out revenge against corrupt corporations.

In 2017, Ryoo was cast in Kim Ki-duk's drama film Human, Space, Time and Human.

In 2019, Ryoo starred in the third installment of the Tazza film series, Tazza: One Eyed Jack.

In March 2023, Ryoo signed with Y One Entertainment.

Other activities
Since 2007, he has been an in-demand club DJ under the name "DJ Ryoo."

He, Shin Min-ah and Hyun Bin were chosen as models for the laptop LG Xnote in 2008. In line with this, they appeared in the branded entertainment campaign Summer Days, which aired in seven short films or episodes (each approximately 4 minutes long; total running time is 30 minutes). These included two music videos by You Hee-yeol: Summer Day featuring Shin Jae-pyung of Peppertones, and My Happy Day sung by Shin Min-ah.

Ryoo is friends with Gary and Gil, who comprise the hip hop duo Leessang. He has appeared in several music videos for their songs, including Ballerino (2007) and The Girl Who Can't Break Up, The Boy Who Can't Leave (2009), which were both directed by his brother Ryoo Seung-wan. Ryoo won the Music Video Acting award at the Mnet KM Music Festival (now called the Mnet Asian Music Awards) for Leessang's I'm Not Laughing (2005). They also collaborated on the Bloody Tie track Who Are You Living For? (2006), with Hwang Jung-min on vocals, and Leessang and Ryoo as rappers. Ryoo Seung-Bum and Leessang toured together to Sydney, Australia for the first time in 2009 with show producer, Leonard Dela Torre.

He is also known in the entertainment industry as an eccentric dresser, simultaneously landing him in worst-dressed lists, while others label him an experimental "fashionista." Ryoo said he believes fashion is a form of communication, and aims for wit in his personal style. In an interview, celebrity photographer Zo Sunhi called Ryoo her favorite subject, saying, "He's someone who has shown his soul in front of the camera. He's the one person who wasn't inhibited or concerned with how amazing he should look, nor did he try to hide anything in front of the lens. There was no false pretenses or superficiality to him. He was an open book. Truly a free spirit. And because he didn't care how he looked, there was truth in his photographs."

Personal life
Ryoo began dating actress Gong Hyo-jin after they grew close on the set of 2001's Wonderful Days; the two had in fact shared one class in elementary school before Gong transferred out. In a rare move for Korean celebrities, the young stars publicly admitted their relationship. The real-life couple again starred together in 2002 comedy Conduct Zero. They broke up in 2003, but remained friends, and Ryoo made a cameo appearance in Gong's film Family Ties in 2006. The couple reunited in 2008, and both appeared in Dachimawa Lee, though they did not share any scenes. In 2010 Ryoo made a cameo in Gong's TV series Pasta, and he complimented her in an interview in 2011. Often topping surveys of favorite Korean celeb couples, they shocked fans in 2012 by announcing that they had ended their relationship.

Marriage 
In 2020, Ryoo married a non-celebrity Slovak girlfriend who is 10 years younger than him and that he had a daughter. Ryoo's wife is known to have worked as a painter in France.

Filmography

Film

Television series

Music video

Theater

Discography

Awards and nominations

References

External links
 
 
 

People from Asan
21st-century South Korean male actors
South Korean male film actors
South Korean male stage actors
South Korean male television actors
1980 births
Living people
MAMA Award winners
Best New Actor Paeksang Arts Award (television) winners